The Anglican ecclesiastical province of Uganda, Rwanda and Burundi was formed in 1961 following the division of the diocese of Uganda the previous year. Prior to 1980, the province included Uganda, Rwanda, Burundi and Boga, in what was then the country of Zaire. In 1960, the Diocese of Uganda was separated and in 1961 the smaller dioceses made a separate Province, under the Archbishop of Uganda, Rwanda and Burundi: , the Church of Uganda is divided into 34 dioceses and is under the Archbishop of Uganda and Bishop of Kampala.

Archbishops of Uganda, Rwanda and Burundi
1961–1966: Leslie Brown, Bishop of Namirembe
1966–1972: Erica Sabiti, Bishop of Ruwenzori

Archbishops of Uganda, Rwanda, Burundi and Boga-Zaire
1972–1974: Erica Sabiti, Bishop of Kampala
1974–1977: Janani Luwum, Bishop of Kampala

Archbishops of Uganda and Bishops of Kampala
1977–1984: Silvanus Wani (Archbishop of Uganda, Rwanda, Burundi and Boga-Zaire until 1980)
1984–1995: Yona Okoth (previously Bishop of Bukedi)
1995–2004: Livingstone Mpalanyi Nkoyoyo
2004–2012: Henry Luke Orombi
2012–2020: Stanley Ntagali
1 March 2020present: Stephen Kaziimba

See also
 Anglican dioceses of Buganda
 Anglican dioceses of Eastern Uganda
 Anglican dioceses of Northern Uganda
 Anglican dioceses of Ankole and Kigezi
 Anglican dioceses of Rwenzori
 Roman Catholic Archbishop of Kampala

References

Church of Uganda